Christian Jacq (born 28 April 1947) is a French author and Egyptologist. He has written several novels about ancient Egypt, notably a five book series about pharaoh Ramses II, a character whom Jacq admires greatly.

Biography
Born in Paris, Jacq's interest in Egyptology began when he was thirteen, when he read History of Ancient Egyptian Civilization by Jacques Pirenne. This inspired him to write his first novel. By the time he was eighteen, he had written eight books. His first commercially successful book was Champollion the Egyptian, published in 1987. , he has written over fifty books, including several non-fiction books on the subject of Egyptology.

Jacq has a doctorate in Egyptian Studies from the Sorbonne. He and his wife later founded the Ramses Institute, which is dedicated to creating a photographic description of Egypt for the preservation of endangered archaeological sites.

Between 1995 and 1997, he published his best-selling five book suite Ramsès, which is today published in over twenty-five countries. Each volume encompasses one aspect of Ramses's known historical life, woven into a fictional tapestry of the ancient world for an epic tale of love, life and deceit.

Jacq's series describes a vision of the life of the pharaoh: he has two vile power-hungry siblings, Shanaar, his decadent older brother, and Dolora, his corrupted older sister who married his teacher. In his marital life, he first has Isetnofret (Iset) as a mistress (second Great Wife), meets his true love Nefertari (first Great Wife) and after their deaths, marries Maetnefrure in his old age. Jacq gives Ramses only three biological children: Kha'emweset, Meritamen (she being the only child of Nefertari, the two others being from Iset) and Merneptah. The other "children" are only young officials trained for government and who are nicknamed "sons of the pharaoh".

Books
These books are typically classed as historical fiction; many of them delve into the supernatural powers given to the Pharaoh, however, and could be considered fantasy by loose definition.

The Ramses Series
The story of the greatest Pharaoh in history
The Son of Light (1995)
The Temple of a Million Years Formerly published as The Eternal Temple (1995)
The Battle of Kadesh (1996)
The Lady of Abu Simbel (1996)
Under the Western Acacia (1997)

The Stone of Light Series
The craftsman's village at Deir al-Madinah is one of the few places in the ancient world where life has been vividly preserved. Jacq uses real names, characters and scandals to reconstruct life in this extraordinary place.
Nefer the Silent
The Wise Woman
Paneb the Ardent
The Place of Truth

The Queen of Freedom Trilogy
The tale of Queen Ahhotep, Egypt's "Joan of Arc" and her crusade to liberate her nation from the Hyksos oppressors
The Empire of Darkness
War of the Crowns
The Flaming Sword

The Judge of Egypt Trilogy
In the Age of Ramses, Egypt's power is unchallenged. However, a dark conspiracy seeks to strike at the Pharaoh ... only an idealistic judge and a young doctor stand between Egypt and oblivion.
Beneath the Pyramid
Secrets of the Desert
Shadow of the Sphinx

The Mysteries of Osiris Series
The Tree of Life
The Conspiracy of Evil
The Way of Fire
The Great Secret

The Vengeance of the Gods Series
Manhunt
The Divine Worshipper

The Mozart Series
The Great Magician
The Son of Enlightenment
The Brother of Fire
The Beloved of Isis

Other books
Egyptian Magic (non-fiction 1985)
The Black Pharaoh
The Tutankhamun Affair
For the Love of Philae
Champollion the Egyptian
Master Hiram and King Solomon
The Living Wisdom of Ancient Egypt (non-fiction)
Fascinating Hieroglyphics (non-fiction 1997)
Magic and Mystery in Ancient Egypt (non-fiction 1998)
The Wisdom of Ptah Hotep (non-fiction 2006)
Tutankhamun: The Last Secret (February 2009)
The Judgement of the Mummy (2009)
Egypt (non fiction 2009)

References
 Annette Lévy-Willard, « Christian Jacq, le nouveau pharaon », Libération, 09/05/1996.
 Françoise Monier, « Christian Jacq : scribe best-seller », L'Express, 03/08/2000.
 Thiébault Dromard, « Christian Jacq ou le bon filon de Bernard Fixot », Le Figaro économie, 12/08/2004.
 Blaise de Chabalier, « Christian Jacq, dans la peau d'un scribe », Le Figaro, 29/01/2009.
 Christian Jacq, « L'Égypte pharaonique n'existe plus, mais ses valeurs persistent », Le Figaro magazine, 01/05/2009.
 Émilie Grangeray, « Christian Jacq, la saga du "petit scribe" », Le Monde, 20/03/2009.
 Laure Mentzel, « Docteur Christian et le mystère Jacq », Le Figaro, 05/11/2010.
 Isabelle Falconnier, « Christian Jacq : un Égyptien à Blonay », L'Hebdo, 18/12/2014.

External links

1947 births
Living people
Writers from Paris
French Egyptologists
20th-century French novelists
21st-century French novelists
University of Paris alumni
French historical novelists
Writers of historical fiction set in antiquity
French male novelists
French children's writers
Winners of the Prix Broquette-Gonin (literature)
Prix Maison de la Presse winners
20th-century French male writers
21st-century French male writers
French male non-fiction writers